Pentagon is the first extended play from South Korean boy band Pentagon. It was released on October 10, 2016, by Cube Entertainment. The album consists of seven tracks, including the title track, "Gorilla".

Commercial performance
The EP sold 19,772+ copies in South Korea. It peaked at number 7 on the Korean Gaon Chart.

Track listing

Charts

References

2016 debut EPs
Cube Entertainment EPs
Pentagon (South Korean band) EPs
Kakao M EPs
Albums produced by Hui (singer)
Korean-language EPs
Korean-language albums